George Alexander McGuire (28 March 1866 – 10 November 1934) is best known for his prominence in Marcus Garvey's Universal Negro Improvement Association (UNIA). McGuire was elected in 1920 as Chaplain-General of the UNIA and wrote important documents about black ritual and catechism, drawing from his knowledge of religion and African history. Both he and Garvey were immigrants to the United States from Caribbean islands who had a vision of Pan-African goals.

In addition McGuire was known for his other religious contributions. Already a minister in the Moravian Church when he immigrated in 1894 to the US, McGuire soon joined the Episcopal Church. He was ordained in 1897 as an Episcopal priest. An early member of the American Negro Historical Society in Philadelphia, McGuire became more concerned about developing institutions that supported persons of African ancestry. In 1921 McGuire founded the African Orthodox Church (AOC); and he was consecrated that year as its first bishop, serving until his death in 1934. During his tenure, new congregations were started in several cities in the US, Canada, the Caribbean, and in East Africa.

McGuire envisioned the AOC as a home for Blacks of Episcopal belief who wanted ecclesiastical independence. It was based on Christian tradition and Apostolic succession. Orthodoxy attracted persons of African descent because it had not been implicated in colonialism or slavery.

Life

George McGuire was born to an Afro-Caribbean family on 28 March 1866 in Swetes, Antigua. He studied in local grammar schools, then at the Antigua branch of Mico College for teachers. He also studies at the Moravian Miskey Seminary in the Danish West Indies. From 1888 to 1894 McGuire served as pastor of a Moravian Church in the Danish West Indies.

Episcopal Church USA
In 1894, McGuire immigrated to the United States. He initially joined the African Methodist Episcopal Church, which was the first independent black denomination in the country, founded in the early nineteenth century. On 2 January 1895, McGuire formally joined the Episcopal Church, and two years later he was ordained as a priest.

McGuire was called to lead small, mostly black Episcopal churches in Cincinnati, Ohio; Richmond, Virginia; and Philadelphia. St. Philip's Episcopal Church of Richmond, Virginia lists "Reverend George Alexander McQuire" as rector from April 1898 to November 1900. After McGuire's tenure, the Rev. Robert Josias "Raphael" Morgan was listed as the rector there from "1901 – April 1901", likely acting on an interim basis until a full-time rector was called. The two men may have known each other. Morgan was later known as Fr. Raphael when he was ordained in 1907 as an Orthodox priest.

By 1901 McGuire was appointed rector of St. Thomas' Episcopal Church in Philadelphia; this was the first black congregation in the Episcopal Church. Saint Thomas served the African-American elite of Philadelphia. It had been started in 1794 by Absalom Jones, earlier a founder with Richard Allen of the Free African Society. This mutual aid society preceded the African Methodist Episcopal Church founded by Allen. McGuire was rector of St. Thomas from 1902–05.

He was succeeded as rector there by A.C.V. Cartier (1906–12). Cartier later followed Fr. Raphael Morgan in his interest in the Eastern Orthodox Church. In 1908 Fr Raphael recommended Cartier to the Ecumenical Patriarchate for Orthodox ordination.

From 1905 to 1909, McGuire served as Archdeacon for Colored Work in the Diocese of Arkansas. He was the church's highest-ranking African American and the first to achieve the rank of Archdeacon. He worked to increase the number of missions in the state from one to nine. He encountered opposition from the local Episcopal bishop, who believed blacks should be segregated from whites and placed in their own church jurisdiction. Following the Reconstruction era, Arkansas and other southern states had imposed legal racial segregation in most public and private facilities. At the turn of the century, Arkansas and other former Confederate states effectively disenfranchised most black citizens by raising barriers to voter registration.

Eventually McGuire resigned and moved North to Cambridge, Massachusetts. There he established St. Bartholomew's Church for West Indians who were living in the Boston area. While in Cambridge, McGuire also studied at Boston College of Physicians and Surgeons, receiving his M.D. degree in 1910. When his small church was not recognized by the Episcopal diocese, McGuire resigned in 1911. As he traveled across the U.S., he became more discouraged, believing that blacks did not have opportunities to advance in the Episcopal Church, and decided to leave it.

Return to Antigua

In 1913 McGuire returned to the West Indies, settling in British-controlled Antigua to care for his sick mother. While there he volunteered at a local parish, serving as a minister in the Church of England. The church was that of St. Paul in the Parish of St. Paul's Antigua. He served between 1913 -  1916 as Rector of the parish church. His name is listed as part of the priests who served. His signature can be viewed in the parish records. He gained acclaim for practicing medicine on the island. When a strike of local sugar cane workers led to rioting and burning of the sugar cane fields, British colonial officials urged local and religious leaders to oppose the strikes, but McGuire refused and urged official to ensure that workers were paid decent, living wages.

UNIA

McGuire returned to the United States in 1918 and soon afterward joined the UNIA. Marcus Garvey, a Jamaican immigrant and the president and founder of UNIA, appointed him as first Chaplain-General of the organization, at its inaugural international convention in New York in August 1920. In this position McGuire wrote two important documents of UNIA, "Universal Negro Ritual", and "Universal Negro Catechism", the latter containing both religious and historical sections, reflecting his interest in religion and race history.

This was a period of black disillusionment and disenchantment with their status and with the enactment of discriminatory laws. This was not only true in the American South, but also in the Northern cities where the discrimination was also pervasive. In this period, some black leaders promoted separate development of the races.  The mainline churches, such as the Episcopal Church (Anglican), wanted to bring faith to the Blacks, but did not want to advocate "political and social equality".

African Orthodox Church

On 2 September 1921, in the Church of the Good Shepherd in New York City, McGuire founded the African Orthodox Church(AOC). The new denomination was first called the Independent Episcopal Church. A few years later at its first Conclave, or House of Bishops meeting, on 10 September 1924, the denomination was formally organized as the African Orthodox Church (AOC).

McGuire believed that blacks who supported the Protestant Episcopal church deserved ecclesiastical independence. Based on traditional Roman Catholic doctrines, was open to all but was under complete black leadership and control. McGuire declared to his followers: "You must forget the white gods. Erase the white gods from your hearts. We must go back to the native church, to our own true God."

McGuire may have been attracted to the Eastern Orthodox Church because it was not associated with racism, colonialism or religious imperialism. It was never involved in widespread missionary activity and had limited contacts with Afro-Americans and Africans. It was not perceived as racist. The adherents of Eastern Orthodoxy were primarily southern and eastern Europeans, people who were recent immigrants to the US and not associated with the establishment. Oriental Orthodoxy was based in what was then known as the Middle East, Egypt, Ethiopia and southern India. The name, African Orthodox Church, "denoted its aim: to be a universal Black church in affiliation with a branch of Christianity not known for racism or colonialism."

Article one of the constitution of the African Orthodox church said: 
The name of this church, which was organized September 2nd, 1921, is and shall be THE AFRICAN ORTHODOX CHURCH. Its faith as declared, is Orthodox, in conformity with the Orthodox Churches of the East from which its Episcopate is derived. While it admits to membership and other privileges persons of all races, IT SEEKS PARTICULARLY TO REACH OUT TO THE MILLIONS OF AFRICAN DESCENT IN BOTH HEMISPHERES, and declares itself to be perpetually autonomous and controlled by Negroes. Hence the name, AFRICAN ORTHODOX.

Shortly after the UNIA convention in August 1924, McGuire broke with Marcus Garvey. He focused on expanding the AOC church, which primarily attracted Anglican immigrants from the West Indies who were from the High Church Anglican tradition (Anglo-Catholicism). McGuire would have liked the AOC to be designated as the official church of UNIA, but Garvey was unwilling to grant such an exclusive privilege to any denomination. McGuire resigned from the UNIA. He ensured official "orthodox" status for his new church by arranging apostolic succession for himself.

Consecration in the American Catholic Church

McGuire initiated negotiations with the Russian Orthodox Church in America in order to obtain valid Apostolic Orders. The Russians were hesitant to assist the formation of another "independent" jurisdiction, however. They were willing to talk, but in the end, they intended to fully control this Black church. This was unacceptable to Fr. McGuire and the other leaders of this new jurisdiction. He met with similar positions from representatives of other Orthodox groups in the U.S.A. Finally the African Orthodox Church entered into negotiations with Archbishop Joseph René Vilatte of the "American Catholic Church" (ACC), an episcopal sect which he had founded.

Fr. McGuire was re-ordained as Bishop in the American Catholic Church, consecrated on 28 September 1921, in Chicago, Illinois, by Archbishop Joseph René Vilatte. He was assisted by bishop Carl A. Nybladh, who had been consecrated by Vilatte.

The early issues of The Negro Churchman, the official organ of the AOC, had articles that repeatedly tried to establish the validity of McGuire's consecration. On at least four occasions, a chart was printed on the cover page that traced the apostolic succession from the See of Antioch to McGuire:
 Ignatius Peter III (IV), Syro-Jacobite Patriarch of Antioch and successor to S. Peter consecrated:
 Paul Athanasius (Paulose Mar Athanasious) in 1877, consecrated:
 Archbishop Alvarez of Ceylon in 1889, consecrated:
 Archbishop Vilatte in 1892, consecrated:
 Bishop McGuire in 1921.

Meeting with the Ecumenical Patriarch

McGuire tried to gain recognition from the Greek Orthodox Ecumenical Patriarch of Constantinople. In December 1921, three months after his consecration, McGuire, through the intercession of Eastern Orthodox prelates, was granted an audience with Patriarch Meletios while the latter was on a visit to New York City. The Patriarch was interested in the origins and dogma of the AOC. He accepted the Jacobite episcopal source as legitimate but was concerned over its monophysite dogma. McGuire apparently had no difficulty in satisfying the Patriarch. Meletios also was concerned with Western Christian influences in dogma that might have permeated the AOC, especially on the question of the nature of the Trinity. (Both Roman Catholicism and Anglicanism adhere to the belief that the Holy Spirit proceeds from both the Father and Son, while Orthodoxy holds procession only from the Father). Here too McGuire appears to have satisfied the Patriarch.

Areas of agreement between Greek Orthodoxy and the AOC included common acceptance of the dogmatic decisions of the seven Ecumenical Councils, the seven Sacraments, the original form of the Nicene Creed, the concept of transubstantiation, the declaration of the Virgin Mary as Mother of God (God-bearer or Theotokos in Greek Orthodoxy), justification by both faith and good works, and the rejection of predestination, a Protestant Calvinist belief. McGuire claimed that the Patriarch accepted the AOC as an Orthodox Church but would not afford it communion with Eastern Orthodoxy until it demonstrated stability and growth.

In 1924 Meletios and his successor, Gregorios VII, requested more information and received copies of the AOC's Divine Liturgy, canons, constitution and Declaration of Faith. The AOC never gained the desired recognition from a major Eastern Orthodox Church. Orthodoxy does recognize different rites, but its leaders may have rejected the apparent eclectic nature of the AOC's liturgy and services. At the church's inception, the liturgy was described as a mixture of Roman Catholicism, Anglicanism and Orthodoxy. The chief service was the Mass; minor and major orders were conferred through the Catholic Pontifical; and the official hymnal was the Anglican Hymns Ancient and Modern. The AOC was essentially High Anglican and it was Orthodox only to the extent that its leader had the title of Patriarch, that the original form of the Nicene Creed had been adopted, and that its episcopal source was in an Oriental Orthodox Church.

AOC consolidation and growth 1924–1934

In 1924, the newly organized conclave of AOC unanimously elected McGuire as archbishop of the church. During the remaining decade of his life, McGuire built the AOC into a thriving international church. Branches were eventually established in Miami, Chicago, Harlem (New York), Boston, and Cambridge, Massachusetts of the US, Canada, Barbados, Cuba, South Africa, Uganda, Kenya, and elsewhere. The official organ of AOC, The Negro Churchman, was an effective link for the far-flung organization, with McGuire as its editor. Endich Theological Seminary was founded shortly thereafter, as well as an Order of Deaconesses.

In 1925 McGuire founded an AOC parish in West Palm Beach, Florida. Two years after that, he consecrated Daniel William Alexander, an African clergyman, as Metropolitan Archbishop for South Africa and central and southern Africa. At the same time McGuire was elected Patriarch of the denomination with the title Alexander I. The church spread to Uganda as well, where it grew to about 10,000 members.

On 8 November 1931 McGuire dedicated Holy Cross Pro-Cathedral in Harlem (New York). His church maintained its greatest strength in NYC.

Death

McGuire died 10 November 1934. He is buried in Woodlawn Cemetery in the Bronx, New York City. He was survived by his wife, Ada Robert McGuire (also a native of Antigua), and one daughter.

At the time of his death in 1934, the African Orthodox Church claimed over 30,000 members, fifty clergy, and thirty churches located on three continents: North America, South America and Africa.

George Alexander McGuire was canonized by the African Orthodox Church on 31 July 1983 and is a saint of that church.

Historical perspective

The movement for ecclesiastical independence started by McGuire in 1921 can be viewed from two perspectives.

First, it was an expression of Black cultural independence in the United States and Africa. It was an effort to promote widespread religious unity under Black leadership. The AOC's inclusion within the apostolic succession was intended to give it legitimacy both within the Black community and larger Christian world. McGuire did not achieve the growth in his church that he hoped for. While it did increase in size during its first decade, this was primarily through his forceful personality rather than attraction to its principle of apostolic succession. After McGuire's death, the AOC splintered and weakened. In South Africa there was growth, but not at the rate anticipated by Daniel William Alexander. He did plant new AOC churches in Uganda and Kenya, where they are now under the administrative umbrella of the Orthodox Patriarchate of Alexandria.

Second, in its attempt to bring together Blacks of the diaspora and Africa into a common movement, the AOC was a manifestation of Pan-Africanism of the period. Spiritual and emotional needs left unattended in their respective countries, propelled Blacks in the United States and South Africa to affiliate and assert their autonomy in an area where the White establishments saw no threat. Discrimination, racism and second-class citizenship engendered this effort at ecclesiastical independence and racial cooperation on both sides of the Atlantic.

See also
 African Orthodox Church
 Harlem Renaissance
 Raphael Morgan
 Eastern Orthodoxy in Uganda

Notes

References

Sources
 Byron Rushing. "A Note on the Origin of the African Orthodox Church." The Journal of Negro History 57:1 (Jan. 1972).
 David Levinson. African Orthodox Church. In: Stephen D. Glazier (Ed.). Encyclopedia of African and African-American Religions. Routledge Encyclopedias of Religion and Society. Taylor & Francis, 2001. pp. 15–16.
 Frank S Mead. Handbook of Denominations in the United States. 10th Ed. Nashville: Abingdon Press, 1995. 
 Gavin White. Patriarch McGuire and the Episcopal Church. In: Randall K. Burkett and Richard Newman (Eds.). Black Apostles: Afro-American Clergy Confront the Twentieth Century. G. K. Hall, 1978. pp. 151–180.
 John Hope Franklin and August Meier (Eds.). Black Leaders of the Twentieth Century. Chicago: University of Illinois Press, 1982.
 Makarios (Tillyrides) of Kenya. The Origin of Orthodoxy in East Africa]. Orthodox Research Institute.
 Rachel Gallaher. McGuire, George Alexander (1866–1934). BlackPast.org.
 Rayford W. Logan and Michael R. Winston (Eds.). Dictionary of American Negro Biography. New York: W.W. Norton, 1982.
 Right Rev. Philippe L. De Coster (B.Th., D.D. (Belgium), Latin Old Roman Catholic Church of Flanders). African Orthodox Church: Its General History. 1st Ed. Publ. Eucharist and Devotion, 1993–2008. 67 pp.
 Theodore Natsoulas. Patriarch McGuire and the Spread of the African Orthodox Church to Africa. Journal of Religion in Africa, Vol. 12, Fasc. 2 (1981), pp. 81–104.
 Tony Martin. McGuire, George Alexander. Encyclopedia of the Harlem Renaissance. Volume 2. Cary D. Wintz, Paul Finkelman (Eds.). Taylor & Francis, 2004. pp. 776–777. 
 Warren C. Platt. The African Orthodox Church: An Analysis of Its First Decade. Church History, Vol. 58, No. 4 (Dec. 1989), pp. 474–488.

External links

 The African Orthodox Church: Its Declaration of Faith: Constitutions and Canons. 14 pp.
 African Orthodox Church Inc.. Net Ministries Network.
 Commemoration of St. George Alexander McGuire. The San Luigi Orders Charitable Trust. 23 August 2012.
  Synod of the African Orthodox Church, Canada, 2014. The San Luigi Orders Charitable Trust. 24 August 2014.
 Tromp Wynn Hayes, Stephen. "The African Orthodox Church." In: ORTHODOX MISSION METHODS: A COMPARATIVE STUDY. Thesis, submitted in fulfillment of the requirements for the degree of Doctor of Theology. University of South Africa, June 1998. pp. 106–107.

1866 births
1934 deaths
19th-century American Episcopalians
20th-century American Episcopalians
20th-century American physicians
20th-century archbishops
20th-century American clergy
African-American Episcopalians
American Episcopal priests
American Anglo-Catholics
American pan-Africanists
Antigua and Barbuda emigrants to the United States
Antigua and Barbuda religious leaders
Clergy of historically African-American Christian denominations
Bishops of Independent Catholic denominations
Independent Catholic patriarchs
Independent Catholic primates
Universal Negro Improvement Association and African Communities League members
People from Saint Paul Parish, Antigua
Burials at Woodlawn Cemetery (Bronx, New York)